Haute-Goulaine is a commune in the Loire-Atlantique department in western France. The commune is located near Nantes. Historically, the commune was part of Brittany.

The chateau de Goulaine is one of the tourist sites that can be visited in the commune. Henri IV of France (king from 1589 to 1610) made the seigneury of Goulaine a marquisate in favour of Gabriel de Goulaine, husband of Marguerite de Bretagne.

On 22 October 1941, six of the 16 hostages shot in Nantes following the attack on Karl Hotz were buried in the Haute-Goulaine cemetery.

Population

See also
Communes of the Loire-Atlantique department

References

Communes of Loire-Atlantique